Damian David George Warner (born November 4, 1989) is a Canadian track and field athlete specializing in decathlon. He is the 2020 Olympic champion and a three-time World medallist (silver in 2015, bronze in 2013 and 2019). Warner also won the bronze medal at the 2016 Summer Olympics and was the 2014 Commonwealth champion and the two-time and reigning Pan American champion from the 2015 and 2019 Games. Warner holds the Pan Am Games record and the Canadian record for the decathlon and the fourth-highest decathlon score in history. Warner also holds the Olympic Games Record for the Decathlon at 9018 points. Competing in the heptathlon, he is the 2022 World Indoor champion.

Notable for his sprinting, Warner holds decathlon bests in the 100 m and 110 m hurdles, running a 10.12 and 13.27, respectively. He formerly held the decathlon best in the long jump (8.28 m) as well.

Career

Early life and career
Warner was born on November 4, 1989, in London, Ontario to Kevin Warner and Brenda Philpott. He attended Montcalm Secondary School where he first showed his athleticism in Grade 10 on the football field and basketball courts.  Warner's natural talent saw him move effortlessly into the athletics scene and by the age of 20, he had won silver in the decathlon at the 2010 Canadian championships with a final score of 7449. He continued to improve over the next two years, winning the decathlon in the next two national championships. His winning performance of 8107 in the 2012 championships was below the Olympic A qualifying standard of 8200, but in combination with his perceived future potential, he was selected to represent Canada at the 2012 Summer Olympics. Warner placed fifth at the 2012 Summer Olympics in London, with a point total of 8442, a jump of 335 points over his previous best score.

2013: World Championship bronze 
In his first outing of 2013, Warner won at the high-profile Hypo Meeting with a score of 8307 points, including bests of 2.09 m in the high jump and 62.84 m in the javelin throw. Following this, Warner went into the 2013 World Championships in Athletics; after the first day, he was in fifth place, but on the second day, he tied a personal best in the pole vault and threw a personal best in the javelin to fight his way into the bronze medal position. After achieving his medal he said "This is such a great feeling, all the hard work my coaches and I put into this the last couple of years. In 2011 I finished 18th and saw the three medallists running around the track with their country's flags draped over their shoulders; I told my coaches that I want that to be me, pretty special feeling to achieve that." Warner's final score of 8,512 was a new personal best and was the first time a Canadian reached the podium in the decathlon at the World Championships since Mike Smith in 1995. He ended his 2013 season with a win at the Decastar meeting with a tally of 8161 points.

2014: Commonwealth Games champion 
The 2014 Commonwealth Games took place in Glasgow, Scotland. There Warner participated in the decathlon, winning the event with a score of 8,282. This was Warner's first decathlon of the year as he was sidelined much of the year with an ankle injury. Despite this, he ran to a 10.29 in the 100 m, a games record for the decathlon, while also setting a PB in the 400 at 47.68. He finished the second day with a games record in the 110 m hurdles in a time of 13.50.

2015: Pan Am champion and World Championship silver 
In 2015 Warner competed for the first time at the Hypo-Meeting in Götzis, but all three of his shot put attempts and did not finish the event. The next major event for him was the 2015 Pan American Games on home soil in Toronto. Warner came into the event as the favourite and broke the national and Pan Am Games records with a score of 8,626. This beat Smith's record, which had stood since 1996.

One month later, at the 2015 World Championships in Athletics, Warner set a new national record of 8695 points and won a silver medal, behind Ashton Eaton's new world record.

2016: Olympic bronze 

At the 2016 Olympics decathlon in Rio de Janeiro, Warner was initially in second place behind Ashton Eaton, but following a surge by France's Kevin Mayer and mediocre performances in the shot put and high jump he dropped to third place by the end of the first day.  On the second day, he regained second place, following a first-place finish in the 100-metre hurdles, but dropped behind Mayer again.  Following the pole vault, he threatened to fall behind Kai Kazmirek but ultimately protected his third-place position with the javelin throw.  He finished in third place behind Eaton and Mayer, earning the bronze medal and becoming the second Canadian to medal in the decathlon, following Dave Steen at the 1988 Olympics in Seoul.

2017: World Championships 
Warner competed at the 2017 IAAF World Championships. Unfortunately, he had to be quarantined after coming down with the norovirus that affected many athletes in London that year. Warner struggled on the first day of competition and had to settle for fifth overall.

2018: Commonwealth Games 
Warner was named to the Canadian team for the 2018 Commonwealth Games, where he was widely considered the frontrunner to defend his 2014 title.  Warner performed strongly on the first day of the decathlon, and midway through the second day, with seven events completed, was leading.  However, disaster struck during the pole vault when Warner failed to clear any height, immediately dropping from first place to sixth.  With no chance of winning a medal, Warner opted to withdraw from the contest.

Following his disappointment in Australia, Warner won his fourth (and third consecutive) Hypo-Meeting, setting a new Canadian record in the process.

2019: World bronze, Pan Am gold 
In May 2019, Warner won his fifth Hypo-Meeting, becoming one of only three athletes to win the event five times.  In the process, he broke his own record for the decathlon best in the 100m sprint with a time of 10.12 seconds and set a new personal best in the shot put.

Warner competed in the 2019 Pan American Games in Lima, aiming to defend his 2015 title.  Despite lingering ankle pain, he successfully repeated as the decathlon champion, finishing 273 points ahead of silver medalist Lindon Victor of Grenada.  Fellow Canadian decathlete Pierce LePage joined him on the podium as bronze medalist.

Warner concluded the season with the decathlon the 2019 World Championships in Doha.  Midway through the event, defending champion Kevin Mayer of France withdrew due to injury, briefly making Warner the perceived favourite for the gold medal.  However, Warner performed below his normal standard in some events and was in second place heading into the final segment of the competition, the 1500m race.  He finished ninth in that segment, below his personal best time, and dropped to third place overall behind a surging Niklas Kaul of Germany and Estonia's Maicel Uibo.  This was his third World championship medal. However, with the COVID-19 pandemic forcing the cancellation of the 2020 international athletic season and the delaying of the Tokyo Olympics, it would prove to be his final competition for almost two years.

2021: Olympic gold 
The pandemic brought additional challenges for Warner, as the training facilities at the University of Western Ontario were closed, and he was unable to travel to the United States to train.  Instead, he and his coaches transformed the unheated interior of London, Ontario's 66-year-old Farquharson Arena into a decathlete training facility.  However, he later credited the time away from competition as affording the opportunity to heal persistent ankle injuries.

Warner returned to competition at the 2021 Hypo-Meeting, where he became the first man to win six event titles.  He set his third decathlon best, this time in the long jump, at 8.28m, and a new personal and national record in overall points, with 8,995 points.  He was only five points short of becoming the fourth decathlete in history to score 9000 points.

The decathlon event at the 2020 Summer Olympics was widely considered at the outset to be a contest for gold between Warner and French rival Kevin Mayer. On day one, Warner opened the event by repeating his world decathlon best time of 10.12 in the 100 m sprint, setting an Olympic Games record in the process. In the long jump, he recorded a distance of 8.24 metres, another Olympic record and just 0.04 shy of the world decathlon best he had set earlier at the Hypo-Meeting. His distance would have earned him a bronze medal in the long jump.  He then set a season-best in the shot put, reaching 14.80 metres in his third throw. In the high jump, he cleared 2.02 m but conceded ground to Mayer, who successfully cleared 2.08 m.  Warner closed out the day in the 400 m, recording a season-best time of 47.48, finishing third behind Australian Ashley Moloney and compatriot Pierce LePage.  Halfway through, Warner was in first place with 4722 points, 81 points ahead of Moloney.

Day two of the Olympic decathlon began with Warner running the 110 m hurdles in 13.46, one-tenth of a second slower than his season-best but an Olympic record, his third of the competition. He then recorded a 48.67 m opening discus throw, which would end up being the third-best in the field, ahead of Mayer. In the pole vault, traditionally his weakest event, Warner equalled his previous personal best of 4.90 m. Mayer cleared 5.20 m in the same segment where he was expected to make up significant ground, and as a result, Warner maintained a lead of 361 points on his main rival at the end of eight of the ten events. Resuming competition in the afternoon, Warner's best javelin throw covered 63.44	m, close to his personal best. Mayer threw a new personal best distance of 73.09, gaining 147 points on Warner, but this still left Warner ahead by 214 points going into the closing 1500 m race.  Warner came fifth in that segment, taking the gold medal and, in the process, becoming the fourth decathlete to score over 9000 points with a score of 9018. This was also a new Olympic record. He was the second Canadian man to win a medal at the Tokyo Olympics, after Andre De Grasse.

As a result of his achievement, Warner was named as Canada's flagbearer for the Olympics closing ceremonies. Warner subsequently stated that he hoped to compete at the 2024 Summer Olympics in Paris to defend his title. At the end of the year, Warner was recognized with both the Lionel Conacher Award from the Canadian Press as the country's top male athlete and the Lou Marsh Trophy for Canada's top athlete.

2022: World heptathlon gold 
Warner was scheduled to begin his season in March at the heptathlon event at the 2022 World Athletics Indoor Championships in Belgrade, but told his coaches in mid-February that he felt "terrible" and unprepared for competition. After extensive work with his coach, physiotherapist, and sports psychologist, he said, "there's still a little bit of that funk in me, but I'm headed in the right direction with the steps we've taken this year from a technical standpoint and training-wise." His main rival, Mayer, was absent due to health complications from contracting COVID-19. Competing at the Indoor Championships, Warner set new personal bests in the 60 m sprint, the 60 m hurdles, and the long jump, the last of those also a new national record, and took the gold medal with a national record score.

Attending the 2022 Hypo-Meeting, Warner was narrowly in second place after the first day of competition, two points behind Swiss decathlete Simon Ehammer, who broke Warner's decathlon best long jump performance at the previous year's meeting. On the second day he took the points lead in the hurdles event, and then maintained it through the remainder, winning his seventh (and sixth consecutive) event title.

Warner opted to withdraw from the Canadian track and field championships, citing the need to manage a chronically sore knee in advance of the 2022 World Athletics Championships. Beginning his quest for the World title at Hayward Field in Eugene, Oregon, Warner finished first in both the 100 m and the long jump on opening day, before posting season's best distances in both the high jump and the shot put. He equaled principal rival Kevin Mayer in the high jump and narrowly beat him in the shot put, traditionally one of Mayer's areas of strength. As a result, he enjoyed a clear lead going into the final event of the first day, the 400 m, but suffered an apparent hamstring injury on the track and was forced to withdraw, ending his competition. Warner said he was "just going to go back and hope this heals and do what every other athlete does and get stronger, and hopefully get myself back on top of the world once again."

It was subsequently determined that Warner had suffered a hamstring strain rather than a more serious tear and was projected to take between six and eight weeks away from training. His coach, Gar Leyshon, speculated that he had a pattern of becoming injured in seasons where he had earlier competed at the World Indoor Championships.

Personal life
Warner and partner Jennifer Cotten, a former elite hurdler, became the parents of a son, Theo, in March of 2021.

Personal bests (outdoor)

 Decathlon best
 Former decathlon best

Championship results

References

External links

 
 
 
 
 
 
 
 

Living people
1989 births
Athletes from London, Ontario
Canadian decathletes
Olympic decathletes
Olympic track and field athletes of Canada
Olympic gold medalists for Canada
Olympic bronze medalists for Canada
Olympic gold medalists in athletics (track and field)
Olympic bronze medalists in athletics (track and field)
Athletes (track and field) at the 2012 Summer Olympics
Athletes (track and field) at the 2016 Summer Olympics
Athletes (track and field) at the 2020 Summer Olympics
Medalists at the 2016 Summer Olympics
Medalists at the 2020 Summer Olympics
Commonwealth Games gold medallists for Canada
Commonwealth Games medallists in athletics
Athletes (track and field) at the 2014 Commonwealth Games
Athletes (track and field) at the 2018 Commonwealth Games
Pan American Games track and field athletes for Canada
Pan American Games gold medalists for Canada
Pan American Games medalists in athletics (track and field)
Athletes (track and field) at the 2015 Pan American Games
Athletes (track and field) at the 2019 Pan American Games
World Athletics Championships athletes for Canada
World Athletics Championships medalists
Canadian people of Barbadian descent
Black Canadian track and field athletes
Canadian Track and Field Championships winners
Pan American Games gold medalists in athletics (track and field)
Medalists at the 2015 Pan American Games
Medalists at the 2019 Pan American Games
World Athletics Indoor Championships winners
Medallists at the 2014 Commonwealth Games